is a passenger railway station in located in the city of  Kishiwada, Osaka Prefecture, Japan, operated by West Japan Railway Company (JR West).

Lines

Station layout
The station consists of two elevated island platforms with the station building underneath. The station has a Midori no Madoguchi staffed ticket office.

Platforms

History
It was renamed  on 1 April 1932, and to its present name on 1 August 1941. With the privatization of the Japan National Railways (JNR) on 1 April 1987, the station came under the aegis of the West Japan Railway Company.

Station numbering was introduced in March 2018 with Higashi-Kishiwada being assigned station number JR-R40.

Passenger statistics
In fiscal 2019, the station was used by an average of 11,322 passengers daily (boarding passengers only).

Surrounding area
 Katsuragi Hospital 
Osaka Prefectural Izumi High School
Osaka Prefectural Kishiwada Support School
 Osaka Technical College
Kishiwada City Habu Junior High School
Senko-ji Temple

See also
List of railway stations in Japan

References

External links

 Higashi-Kishiwada Station Official Site

Railway stations in Osaka Prefecture
Railway stations in Japan opened in 1930
Kishiwada, Osaka